Tiancheng or Tian Cheng may refer to:

Chengdu Tiancheng F.C., a football club based in Chengdu, Sichuan, China
Tian Cheng International, an auction house specializing in the sale of Chinese art and jadeite

Places in China
Tiancheng, Shaanxi, (天成镇) a town in Long County, Shaanxi
Tiancheng, Dazhu (天城镇), a town in Dazhu County, Sichuan
Tiancheng Township, Inner Mongolia (天成乡), a township in Liangcheng County, Inner Mongolia
Tiancheng Township, Sichuan (天成乡), a township in Peng'an County, Sichuan

Historical eras
Tiancheng (555), era name used by Xiao Yuanming, emperor of the Liang dynasty
Tiancheng (758–759), era name used by An Qingxu, emperor of Yan
Tiancheng (926–930), era name used by Li Siyuan, emperor of Later Tang